Sphenopus is a genus of zoanthids within the family Sphenopidae. There are currently 4 species assigned to the genus.

Species 

 Sphenopus arenaceus 
 Sphenopus exilis 
 Sphenopus marsupialis 
 Sphenopus pedunculatus

References 

Hexacorallia genera
Sphenopidae